László Morcz (born 4 April 1956) is a Hungarian former cyclist. He competed in the sprint event at the 1980 Summer Olympics.

References

External links
 

1956 births
Living people
Hungarian male cyclists
Olympic cyclists of Hungary
Cyclists at the 1980 Summer Olympics
Cyclists from Budapest